WRFP-LP (101.9 FM) is a radio station licensed to Eau Claire, Wisconsin, United States. The station is currently owned by Eau Claire Public Access Center, Inc.

References

External links
 

RFP-LP
RFP-LP
Radio stations established in 2005
2005 establishments in Wisconsin